William Bradshaw  was a Welsh politician who sat in the House of Commons from 1604 to 1611.

Bradshaw was the eldest or only son of John Bradshaw of Presteign, Radnorshire. In 1604, he was an Alderman of Cardigan. He was elected Member of Parliament for Cardigan and was seated on petition on 13 April 1604.

References

Year of birth missing
Year of death missing
Members of the Parliament of England (pre-1707) for constituencies in Wales
17th-century Welsh politicians
English MPs 1604–1611